The Dörenberg is a hill, in the Teutoburg Forest in the district of Osnabrück, in the German state of Lower Saxony.

Origin of the name 
Dören could be derived, especially in the area of Ostwestfalen-Lippe, from Dör, the Low German word for a hill or mountain pass.

Location 
The Dörenberg, the highest elevation in the centre section of the Teutoburg Forest, lies between Bad Iburg and the Georgsmarienhütte village of Oesede, whereby the boundary of both parishes runs over its southern flank, close to the summit. East of the hill, the B 51 runs between both settlements in roughly a north-northeast to south-southwest direction. The summit can be reached on woodland tracks from this road.

Hermann's Tower 

On the Lammersbrink, 2.8 kilometres northwest, stands the Varus Tower. Both observation towers are linked by a hiking trail, the Kammweg ("Crest Way") .

1962 air crash 
In 1962 an aeroplane of the Royal Air Force crashed on the Dörenberg. Both crew members died. A memorial stone has been laid on the Zigzag Way (Zickzackweg) that runs from the Karlsplatz west of the summit towards the Benno Quarry. It bears the inscription: "Am 18. Januar 1962 stürzte an dieser Stelle ein Flugzeug ab. Zwei junge Flieger im Alter von 24 und 26 Jahren fanden den Fliegertod." ("On 18 January 1962 an aircraft crashed at this spot. Two young airmen - 24 and 26 years old - died an airman's death.") The memorial tablet stands below the first bend on Zigzag Way.

Panorama

External links 
 Geology of the Dörenberg

Osnabrück (district)
Former mines in Germany
Teutoburg Forest
Natural regions of the Lower Weser Uplands